Proceratophrys laticeps is a species of frog in the family Odontophrynidae.
It is endemic to Brazil.
Its natural habitats are subtropical or tropical moist lowland forest and rivers.
It is threatened by habitat loss.

References

Proceratophrys
Endemic fauna of Brazil
Amphibians of Brazil
Taxa named by Eugênio Izecksohn
Amphibians described in 1981
Taxonomy articles created by Polbot